Anurita Jha (born 17 September 1986) is an Indian actress and model. She hails from Katihar, Bihar and was groomed and studied at Patna and Delhi (correspondence study). She has taken part in fashion weeks in Delhi as well as Mumbai. She made her acting debut in Bollywood with Anurag Kashyap's Gangs of Wasseypur - Part 1 and appeared in its sequel Gangs of Wasseypur - Part 2 too. She took part in the Ford Supermodel competition in 2005, and won the "Channel V Get Gorgeous 2006" competition in 2006.

Filmography

Films

Web series

References

External links
 

Living people
Actresses in Hindi cinema
Actresses from Bihar
Female models from Bihar
Indian film actresses
21st-century Indian actresses
Year of birth missing (living people)